Recklessness may be:

 Recklessness (law), a legal term describing a person's state of mind when allegedly committing a criminal offence.
 Recklessness (psychology), a state of mind in which a person acts without caring what the consequences may be

See also 
 Reckless